Gas, Iran may refer to:
 Gash, Razavi Khorasan
 Gush, Razavi Khorasan